Lazy Lightning is a 1926 American silent Western film directed by William Wyler and starring Art Acord, Fay Wray and Robert Gordon.

Cast
 Art Acord as Lance Lighton 
 Fay Wray as Lila Rogers 
 Robert Gordon as Dickie Rogers 
 Vin Moore as Sheriff Dan Boyd 
 Arthur Morrison as Henry S. Rogers 
 George B. French as Dr. Hull 
 Rex De Rosselli as William Harvey

References

External links
 

1926 films
1926 Western (genre) films
Universal Pictures films
Films directed by William Wyler
American black-and-white films
Silent American Western (genre) films
1920s English-language films
1920s American films